Ascot is a rural locality in Victoria, Australia, 10 km west of Creswick in the City of Ballarat.

A post office named "Ascot" opened on 11 October 1858 and closed in 1969.

References

Towns in Victoria (Australia)
Mining towns in Victoria (Australia)